Gongadze is a Georgian surname. Notable people with the surname include:

 Georgiy Gongadze, Ukrainian journalist of Georgian origin
 Myroslava Gongadze, Ukrainian journalist and political activist now living in the United States, widow of Georgiy Gongadze
 Teimuraz Gongadze, Georgian footballer

Georgian-language surnames
Surnames of Georgian origin